Archduke Ludwig Viktor Joseph Anton of Austria (15 May 1842 – 18 January 1919) was the youngest child of Archduke Franz Karl of Austria and his wife Princess Sophie of Bavaria, and as such was the younger brother of Emperor Franz Joseph I. He had a military career, as was usual for archdukes, but did not take part in politics. He was openly homosexual and declined to marry princesses who were sought for him. He is well known for his art collection and patronage as well as philanthropy.

Family

Ludwig Viktor was born in Vienna. He was the youngest son born to Archduke Franz Karl of Austria and Princess Sophie of Bavaria. His elder siblings included Emperor Franz Joseph I of Austria, Emperor Maximilian I of Mexico and Archduke Karl Ludwig. His family called him by the nickname "Luziwuzi".

Career
During the Revolutions of 1848 and the Vienna Uprising, Ludwig Viktor and his family had to flee the Austrian capital, at first to Innsbruck, later to Olomouc. Ludwig Viktor pursued the usual military career and was appointed General of the Infantry, but had no intentions to interfere in politics. He rejected his brother Maximilian's ambitions in the Second Mexican Empire. Instead he concentrated on building up his own art collection and had Heinrich von Ferstel design and build a city palace on the new Schwarzenbergplatz in Vienna, where Ludwig Viktor hosted homophile soirées.

Personal life
Ludwig Viktor's mother attempted to arrange a marriage for him with Duchess Sophie Charlotte in Bavaria, youngest sister of Empress Elisabeth, but he declined. He likewise rejected plans to marry him to Isabel, daughter and heir presumptive of Emperor Pedro II of Brazil. In 1863, Ludwig Viktor's brother Maximilian had tried to persuade him to marry her because "such a marriage might found yet another Habsburg dynasty in Latin America.... Maximilian wrote to Franz Joseph that Ludwig Viktor was 'anything but pleased with the idea,'" and asked Franz Joseph to order Ludwig Viktor to marry her. Franz Joseph refused.

Ludwig Viktor was "a homosexual and cross-dresser with a reputation as a libertine...." After a scandalous incident at the Central Bathhouse Vienna in which he was publicly slapped, his brother Emperor Franz Joseph finally forbade him to stay in Vienna and joked that he should be given a ballerina as adjutant to keep him out of trouble. 

Ludwig Viktor retired to Klessheim Palace near Salzburg where he became known as a philanthropist and patron of the arts. He died in 1919, at the age of 76, and is buried at the Siezenheim cemetery.

He was awarded the Order of the White Eagle.

Honours
He received the following orders and decorations:

Ancestry

References 

Helmut Neuhold: Das andere Habsburg. Homoerotik im österreichischen Kaiserhaus, Tectum-Verlag

External links

 Ludwig Viktor - 'Archduke Luziwuzi' at The World of The Habsburgs

1842 births
1919 deaths
19th-century German LGBT people
Austrian princes
House of Habsburg-Lorraine
Austrian LGBT people
LGBT Roman Catholics
LGBT royalty
Nobility from Vienna
Grand Croix of the Légion d'honneur
Grand Crosses of the Order of Saint Stephen of Hungary
Grand Crosses of the Order of the Star of Romania
Honorary Knights Grand Cross of the Royal Victorian Order
Knights of the Golden Fleece of Austria
Recipients of the Order of the Cross of Takovo
Recipients of the Order of St. Anna, 1st class
Recipients of the Order of the White Eagle (Russia)
20th-century LGBT people